Wiseblood is the fifth studio album by American heavy metal band Corrosion of Conformity. It was released on October 15, 1996 by Columbia Records, the band's second and final album for the label. Its name comes from the novel Wise Blood, written by Southern Gothic author Flannery O'Connor. Metallica's lead vocalist James Hetfield provides backing vocals on "Man or Ash". The song "Drowning in a Daydream" was nominated for Best Metal Performance at the 40th Grammy Awards ceremony (which went to Tool for "Ænema"). The album had sold 130,000 copies by 1999, selling less than Blind and Deliverance.

Reception

Wiseblood received a mixed-to-positive review from AllMusic writer Stephen Thomas Erlewine, who gave the album four stars out of five. He described Wiseblood as the "closest Corrosion of Conformity have gotten to old-school heavy metal, yet their fondness for industrial soundbites and thrash-metal keeps the group sounding contemporary." However, Erlewine stated that it "doesn't have half the hooks of its predecessor, which means it sounds great while its playing, but it disappears into the abyss once it's finished."

Despite receiving mixed reviews, Wiseblood peaked at number 104 on the Billboard 200; this was the band's highest position on the chart for 22 years, until No Cross No Crown, which peaked at number 67.  It also peaked at number two on the Heatseekers chart. However, it only spent two weeks on the US Billboard 200.

One of the album's singles, "Drowning in a Daydream", peaked at number 27 on the Mainstream Rock chart.

Track listing

Japanese edition

Personnel
Corrosion of Conformity
Pepper Keenan – lead vocals, rhythm guitar
Woody Weatherman – lead guitar
Mike Dean – bass guitar
Reed Mullin – drums

Additional personnel
James Hetfield – background vocals on "Man or Ash" (uncredited)

Chart positions

Album
Billboard (United States)

Singles

References

Corrosion of Conformity albums
1996 albums